Chlaenosciadium gardneri is a species of flowering plant in the family Apiaceae, of the monotypic genus Chlaenosciadium. It is endemic to the Western Australia.

References

Monotypic Apiaceae genera
Flora of Western Australia
Endemic flora of Australia
Mackinlayoideae